Shiv Sangram is a Maratha organization led by Vinayak Mete. It is a part of the Bharatiya Janata Party-led National Democratic Alliance, and fielded its candidates on four seats in the 2014 Maharashtra Legislative Assembly election; the candidates fought on the BJP symbol.

References

 
Far-right political parties in India
Political parties with year of establishment missing